Meristocera is a genus of flies in the family Stratiomyidae.

Species
Meristocera aurea Lindner, 1964
Meristocera laticornis James, 1967

References

Stratiomyidae
Brachycera genera
Taxa named by Erwin Lindner
Diptera of North America
Diptera of South America